Uwe Beginski (born 13 December 1959) is a retired German football player. He spent three seasons in the Bundesliga with Hamburger SV and SV Darmstadt 98.

Honours
 European Cup finalist: 1979–80
 Bundesliga champion: 1978–79
 Bundesliga runner-up: 1979–80

References

External links
 

1959 births
Living people
German footballers
Hamburger SV players
SV Darmstadt 98 players
VfL Osnabrück players
KSV Hessen Kassel players
Bundesliga players
2. Bundesliga players
Association football defenders